Amanda Michelle Fink (born December 4, 1986) is a retired American tennis player. She ranked No. 1 in the US in Under-16s. In 2006, she was the number-one ranked college freshman, and in 2008 she finished the season as the U.S. No. 5 ranked collegiate player. On November 21, 2011, she reached her highest WTA singles ranking of 260, while her best doubles ranking was 228 on September 27, 2010.

Early life
Fink was born in Tarzana, California, the daughter of Howard and Laurie Fink, and is Jewish. She has one sister, Jamie.

Tennis career
Fink attended Calabasas High School (class of 2005). She was named California Interscholastic Federation (CIF) MVP in doubles in 2002 and singles MVP in 2003, 2004, and 2005, named Ventura County Star All-Area Player of the Year in 2003, and an All-American in 2004 and 2005. She placed third in the 2002 Clay Court Nationals, and won the 2005 Hawaii National Open. She ranked No. 1 in the US in under-16s, and No. 2 in the under-18s.

In college at the University of Southern California, where Fink majored in psychology, she was a four-time college All-American and four-time Pac-10 selection in both tennis singles and doubles.

Fink was the No. 1 ranked college freshman, and the Pac-10 Freshman of the Year. In her freshman year in 2006 Fink was named the Intercollegiate Tennis Association (ITA) Rookie of the Year and ended the year ranked No. 8. She won the ITA Western Regional Championship.

In 2008, she was named a ITA All-American for singles and doubles, All-Pac-10 First Team, and Pac-10 All-Academic honorable mention. Fink finished the season as the U.S. No. 5 ranked collegiate player. Fink won the Freeman Memorial Singles Championship. In doubles, teamed up with Gabriela Niculescu, she won the 2008 Pac-10 Doubles Championship, won the ITA West Regional doubles title, and finished the season ranked No. 4 in the nation.

In 2015, she was inducted into the Southern California Jewish Sports Hall of Fame.

ITF Circuit finals

Singles: 4 (1 title, 3 runner-ups)

Doubles: 7 (3 title, 4 runner-ups)

References

External links
 
 
 

1986 births
Living people
People from Tarzana, Los Angeles
American female tennis players
Jewish American sportspeople
Jewish tennis players
USC Trojans women's tennis players
Tennis people from California
21st-century American Jews
21st-century American women